Ecsenius opsifrontalis, known commonly as the comical blenny in Micronesia, is a species of combtooth blenny in the genus Ecsenius. It is found in coral reefs in the Pacific Ocean. It can reach a maximum length of 5 centimetres. Blennies in this species feed primarily off of plants, including benthic algae and weeds, and are commercial aquarium fish.

References
 Chapman, W. M.  and L. P. Schultz  1952 (24 Apr.) Review of the fishes of the blennioid genus Ecsenius, with descriptions of five new species. Proceedings of the United States National Museum v. 102 (3310): 507–528.

External links
 

opsifrontalis
Fish described in 1952